Bevon Kareem Lewis (born May 5, 1991) is an American mixed martial artist who competes in the light heavyweight division. A professional since 2015, he has also competed for Professional Fighters League (PFL), Ultimate Fighting Championship (UFC), Legacy Fighting Alliance (LFA) and Xtreme Caged Combat.

Background
Bevon Kareem Lewis was born in Riverside, California, the son of Basil Lewis and Silda Davis. He was raised in Stone Mountain, Georgia where he competed in football, baseball and wrestling. Lewis began martial arts training one summer break before attending college, helping his father on plumbing works, he saw a group people practicing MMA. Lewis then decided to start training in MMA by working first on his strength and conditioning. He later picked up standup classes and jiu-jitsu, and started to compete professionally in 2015.

Mixed martial arts career

Early career 
With an amateur record of 12–2, Lewis turned pro in 2015 where he fought most of his early professional fights primarily in the Legacy Fighting Alliance and Xtreme Caged Combat. 

Lewis made his first appearances in Dana White's Contender Series 8 web-series program on August 29, 2017, facing Elias Urbina where he won the fight via technical knockout and signed to a development league contract. 

After a win over Collin Huckbody on April 27, 2018 at LFA 38 via a unanimous decision, Lewis made his second appearance in Dana White's Contender Series 12 where faced Alton Cunningham on July 10, 2018 and won the fight via a technical knockout out in round one and was awarded a contract with UFC.

Ultimate Fighting Championship
Lewis  made his UFC debut on December 29, 2018 against Uriah Hall at UFC 232. He lost the fight via knockout in the third round.

His next fight came on June 8, 2018 at UFC 238 against Darren Stewart. He lost the fight by unanimous decision.

Lewis was scheduled to face Alen Amedovski on  May 28, 2020 at UFC Fight Night: Blaydes vs. dos Santos. However, Amedovski was forced pulled out of the event citing injury and was replaced by Dequan Townsend. Lewis won the fight via unanimous decision.

Lewis faced Trevin Giles on November 7, 2020 at UFC on ESPN: Santos vs. Teixeira. He lost the fight via technical knockout.

The UFC announced Lewis's release from the promotion on November 13, 2020.

Post-UFC career
Lewis headlined PFL Challenger Series 6 in a heavyweight bout against Marcelo Nunes on March 25, 2022. He lost the bout via arm-triangle choke in the second round.

Personal life 
His moniker “The Extraordinary Gentleman”  was coined by MMA pioneer Pat Miletich.

Mixed martial arts record

|-
|Loss
|align=center|7–4
|Marcelo Nunes
|Submission (arm-triangle choke)
|PFL Challenger Series 6
|
|align=center|2
|align=center|2:39
|Orlando, Florida, United States
|
|-
|Loss
|align=center|7–3
|Trevin Giles
|TKO (punches)
|UFC on ESPN: Santos vs. Teixeira
|
|align=center|3
|align=center|1:26
|Las Vegas, Nevada, United States
|
|-
|Win
|align=center|7–2
|Dequan Townsend
|Decision (unanimous)
|UFC Fight Night: Blaydes vs. dos Santos
|
|align=center|3
|align=center|5:00
|Raleigh, North Carolina, United States
|
|-
|Loss
|align=center|6–2
|Darren Stewart
|Decision (unanimous)
|UFC 238
|
|align=center|3
|align=center|5:00
|Chicago, Illinois, United States
|
|-
|Loss
|align=center|6–1
|Uriah Hall
|KO (punch)
|UFC 232
|
|align=center|3
|align=center|1:32
|Inglewood, California, United States
|
|-
|Win
|align=center|6–0
|Alton Cunningham
|TKO (knees)
|Dana White's Contender Series 12
|
|align=center|1
|align=center|3:01
|Las Vegas, United States
|
|-
|Win
|align=center|5–0
|Collin Huckbody
|Decision (unanimous)
|LFA 38
|
|align=center|3
|align=center|5:00
|Minneapolis, Minnesota, United States
|
|-
|Win
|align=center|4–0
|Elias Urbina
|KO (punches)
|Dana White's Contender Series 8
|
|align=center|2
|align=center|2:47
|Las Vegas, United States
|
|-
|Win
|align=center|3–0
|Sonny Yohn
|Decision (unanimous)
|LFA 10
|
|align=center|3
|align=center|5:00
|Pueblo, Colorado, United States
|
|-
|Win
|align=center|2–0
|Kristopher Gratalo
|KO (punches)
|Xtreme Caged Combat 24
|
|align=center|3
|align=center|0:52
|Bethlehem, Pennsylvania, United States
|
|-
|Win
|align=center|1–0
|Aaron Aschendorf
|Decision (unanimous)
|House of Fame 4: Florida vs. Georgia
|
|align=center|3
|align=center|5:00
|Jacksonville, Florida, United States
|
|-

See also
List of male mixed martial artists

References

External links
 
 

1991 births
Middleweight mixed martial artists
Mixed martial artists utilizing Brazilian jiu-jitsu
Living people
American male mixed martial artists
American practitioners of Brazilian jiu-jitsu
Ultimate Fighting Championship male fighters